Martin Halla (born 4 June 1988 in Aurskog, Norway) is a Norwegian singer who, on 25 May 2012, won the inaugural series of The Voice – Norges beste stemme, the Norwegian version of The Voice in 2012 and was broadcast on TV2. He was part of "Team Magne" as he was mentored by Magne Furuholmen.

Career
The Voice – Norges beste stemme
In his audition, broadcast on 27 January 2012, Halla residing in Bergen, Norway sang "Somewhere Only We Know" from Keane with two judges Sondre Lerche and Magne Furuholmenhitting the "I Want U" button. He chose to be on Magne's team. On 6 April 2012, in the Battle round, his mentor paired him against contestant Ruben Gundersen also from "Team Magne" and chose to keep Halla after they both sang "Keep On Walking" from Salem Al Fakir.

In the sing-off round, where each coach would nominates 4 acts from the group to advance to the live shows with the 3 remaining acts per group being subjected to the sing-off for the sole remaining spot, Halla was spared the round and advanced to the next round by decision of his mentor.

In the semi-finals he sang "Release Me" from Oh Laura and advanced to the final as the finalist of Team Magne where he faced Aleksander Walmann Åsgården (Team Sondre), Hege Øversveen from Team Hanne and Leif Anders Wentzel of Team Team Yosef. Halla sang "We Found Love" from Rihanna and his winning song "Take It With Me".

Solo
After the win on 25 May 2012 the winning song "Take It With Me" was released as Martin Halla's debut single hitting #3 of VG-lista the official Norwegian Singles Chart on its first week of release. His semi-final rendition "Release Me" also peaked at number 7.

In 2013, Martin Halla released his debut album Winter Days that reached number 5 in the Norwegian Albums Chart.

Discography

Albums

Singles

References

External links
Martin Halla page on TV2 website
Last.fm page

The Voice (franchise) winners
1988 births
Living people
Musicians from Bergen
21st-century Norwegian singers
21st-century Norwegian male singers